Keinänen is a Finnish surname. Notable people with the surname include:

 Ilmari Keinänen (1887–1934), Finnish gymnast
 Sami Keinänen (born 1973), Finnish bass player
 Titta Keinänen, Finnish karateka

Finnish-language surnames